Federica Fontana (born April 30, 1977) is an Italian television sports announcer (especially for soccer games) and TV program hostess, who also does various kinds of modeling on the side.

Biography

Federica started to appear in TV and public ad campaigns at a young age. She also entered beauty contests: at age 18 in 1995, she won the second place crown as Miss Buona Domenica, and the third-place position as Bellissima, participating as an assistant in La sai l'ultima?. In 1997, Federica appeared on television in the programs Presentazione del Milan, Mai dire Gol, Volevo Salutare, Strettamente Personale and was a hostess for Slurpiamo, an on the air program for children on "Junior TV Antenna 3". In 1998, she was in the cast of Scatafascio, Paperissima (1998-99 edition), and Un Anno di Sport. In 1999-2000 she substituted for another announcer in a supporting role for Massimo De Luca in the program Pressing Champions League.

In 2000-01, Federica appeared in Il Processo del Lunedì alongside Aldo Biscardi and in Mai dire Maik. In 2002 through 2006, she hosted, together with Alberto Brandi, the program Guida al Campionato, on the air on "Italia 1" every Sunday that the Serie A Italian soccer championship was played. After that appearance, Federica started to achieve notable popularity, and in 2003 she was called to appear in Ciro presenta Visitors, a comedy, and, in the summertime, in Bande Sonore (as the hostess). In October 2004, Federica appeared in Super Ciro (Italia 1). In 2006-07, she replaced Elisabetta Canalis in Controcampo-Diritto di replica, a TV program on the air every Sunday of the Serie A Italian soccer championship, thus leaving the Guida al Campionato program after four years.

As a model, Federica has posed for magazines (such as FHM and GQ), newspapers, and catalogs, and also for photo calendars, such as the 2004 calendar of the magazine Controcampo, calendars for GQ magazine, and for calendars about Federica herself, featuring at least one photo of her for every month of the year.

External links
Official website

1977 births
Living people
Sportspeople from Monza
Italian television personalities
Italian female models